Sébastien Talabardon (born 16 February 1978) is a French racing cyclist. He rode in the 2001 Tour de France.

References

1978 births
Living people
French male cyclists
Place of birth missing (living people)